Vincent Rüfli (born 22 January 1988) is a Swiss professional footballer who plays for Étoile Carouge as a right back.

Career
On 3 June 2019, Rüfli signed a three-year contract with St. Gallen and got shirt number 99.

On 15 January 2021, he joined Lausanne Ouchy on loan, and then transferred to the club on a permanent basis on 14 July 2021.

References

External links
 
 Vincent Rüfli profile at football.ch
 
 Vincent Rüfli at St. Gallen's website

1988 births
People from Carouge
Sportspeople from the canton of Geneva
Living people
Swiss men's footballers
Association football defenders
Switzerland international footballers
Étoile Carouge FC players
Servette FC players
FC Sion players
Dijon FCO players
Paris FC players
FC St. Gallen players
FC Stade Lausanne Ouchy players
Swiss 1. Liga (football) players
Swiss Challenge League players
Swiss Super League players
Ligue 1 players
Ligue 2 players
Championnat National 3 players
Swiss Promotion League players
Swiss expatriate footballers
Expatriate footballers in France
Swiss expatriate sportspeople in France